Platanthera chlorantha, commonly known as greater butterfly-orchid, is a species of orchid in the genus Platanthera. It can be found throughout Europe and Morocco. The name Platanthera is derived from Greek, meaning "broad anthers", while the species name, chlorantha, means "green-flowered".

Greater butterfly-orchid is similar to lesser butterfly-orchid, Platanthera bifolia, which is about the same size, but with smaller flowers. Greater butterfly-orchid is a herbaceous perennial of medium height. Its leaves are broad, shiny and elliptical, with a large pair at the base, and much smaller, more lanceolate leaves up the stem. The flowers are greenish-white, scented of vanilla, with spreading sepals and petals. The lip of the flower is long, narrow and undivided. The flower has a very long spur. The flowers form a rather loose spike. The pollen masses diverge to touch both sides of the pollinating insect. Flowering in Britain is in June to July, but earlier in the south of Europe. The plant is found in woods, open scrub, and grassland including on chalk.

Its world distribution is broadly endemic to Europe: from the British Isles in the west to European Russia and the Caucasus in the east; and from the coastal region of Norway to 65°N, down to the whole of Italy and the Balkans excluding most of Greece. There are scattered outliers in Spain, Turkey, and North Africa. (Codes)

Notes

References 
 Richard Fitter, Alastair Fitter, Marjorie Blamey. The Wild Flowers of Britain and Northern Europe. Collins, London. 1st Edition, 1974.
 Den virtuella floran (The virtual flora, in Swedish) http://linnaeus.nrm.se/flora/mono/orchida/plata

External links 
Den virtuella floran - Platanthera chlorantha distribution

chlorantha
Orchids of Europe
Flora of Morocco